Triumph Trophy has been the name of several models of motorcycles produced by Triumph Engineering and its successor, Triumph Motorcycles Ltd.

Trophy
Trophy